Alk was a  cargo ship that was built in 1924 by Neptun AG, Rostock, Germany for German owners. She was seized by the Allies in May 1945, passed to the Ministry of War Transport (MoWT) and was renamed Empire Contest. In 1946, she was allocated to the Soviet Union and renamed Vereshyagin (Верещагин). She served until about 1960, being deleted from Lloyd's Register in that year.

Description
The ship was built in 1924 by Neptun AG.

The ship had a GRT of 1,175 and a NRT of 612.

The engine was built by Neptun.

History
Alk was built for Roland Linie AG, Bremen. Her port of registry was Bremen and she was allocated the Code Letters QLWM. By 1926, Norddeutscher Lloyd had taken over Roland Linie. In 1933, Alk was transferred to Argo Reederei AG, Bremen. In 1934, her Code Letters were changed to DOMF. In 1936, the company changed its name to Argo Reederei Richard Adler & Co.

In May 1945, Alk was seized by the Allies at Brunsbüttel. She was passed to the MoWT and renamed Empire Contest. Her port of registry was changed to London. The Code Letters GQXW and United Kingdom Official Number 180747 were allocated. She was placed under the management of W A Wilson Ltd.

In 1946, Empire Contesnt was transferred to the Soviet Government and was renamed Vereshyagin. Her port of registry was changed to Archangelsk. She served until c1960, when she was deleted from shipping registers.

References

1924 ships
Ships built in Rostock
Steamships of Germany
Merchant ships of Germany
World War II merchant ships of Germany
Ministry of War Transport ships
Empire ships
Steamships of the United Kingdom
Merchant ships of the United Kingdom
Steamships of the Soviet Union
Merchant ships of the Soviet Union